Krasnoye-na-Volge is an urban locality (an urban-type settlement) in Krasnoselsky District of Kostroma Oblast, Russia. Population:

References

Urban-type settlements in Kostroma Oblast
Krasnoselsky District, Kostroma Oblast
Kostromskoy Uyezd